The Blomberg–Fritsch affair, also known as the Blomberg–Fritsch crisis (German: Blomberg–Fritsch–Krise), was the name given to two related scandals in early 1938 that resulted in the subjugation of the German Armed Forces (Wehrmacht) to dictator Adolf Hitler.  As documented in the Hossbach Memorandum, Hitler had been dissatisfied with the two high-ranking military officials concerned, Werner von Blomberg and Werner von Fritsch, regarding them as too hesitant with the war preparations he demanded. As a result, a marriage scandal and a manufactured accusation of homosexuality were used to remove Blomberg and Fritsch, respectively.

Blomberg marriage
The Blomberg–Fritsch affair began soon after the marriage on 12 January 1938 of the War Minister Werner von Blomberg to Erna Gruhn, when the Berlin police discovered she had a long criminal record and had posed for pornographic photographs. According to testimony given much later, at the Nuremberg trials, information received by the Police Commissioner within days also indicated that "Marshal von Blomberg's wife had been a previously convicted prostitute who had been registered as a prostitute in the files of seven large German cities; she was in the Berlin criminal files. ... She had also been sentenced by the Berlin courts for distributing indecent pictures."

Marriage to a person with such a criminal record violated the standard of conduct expected of officers, as defined by Blomberg himself, and came as a shock to Hitler, as Luftwaffe chief Hermann Göring had been Blomberg's best man, and Hitler himself had served as a witness at the wedding. Hitler and Göring saw the development as an opportunity to dispose of Blomberg.

Hitler ordered Blomberg to have the marriage annulled to avoid a scandal and to preserve the integrity of the army. Blomberg refused to annul the marriage but after Göring threatened to make his wife's past public knowledge, he resigned from his posts on 27 January 1938.

Fritsch affair
The events surrounding Blomberg's marriage inspired Hermann Göring and Heinrich Himmler to arrange a similar affair for Commander-in-Chief Werner von Fritsch. Göring did not want Fritsch to become the successor to Blomberg and thus his superior. Himmler wanted to weaken the Wehrmacht and its mainly-aristocratic generals to strengthen his Schutzstaffel (SS), as a competitor to the regular German Army (Heer). In 1936, Reinhard Heydrich had prepared a file on Fritsch that had allegations of homosexuality and had passed the information on to Hitler, but Hitler had rejected it and ordered Heydrich to destroy the file. However, Heydrich did not do so. In 1938, Heydrich resurrected the old file on Fritsch, who was again accused of being a homosexual by Himmler. It was reported that Fritsch had been encouraged by General Ludwig Beck to carry out a military putsch against the Hitler regime but that he declined and resigned on 4 February 1938, to be replaced by Walther von Brauchitsch, whom Fritsch had recommended for the post.

Reorganisation of army
Hitler used the situation to transfer the duties of the Ministry of War (Reichskriegsministerium) to a new organisation, the Supreme Command of the Armed Forces (Oberkommando der Wehrmacht, or OKW), and Wilhelm Keitel, who became the new head of the OKW on 4 February 1938. That weakened the traditional Army High Command (Oberkommando des Heeres, or OKH), which was now subordinated to the OKW.

Hitler took further advantage of the situation by replacing several generals and ministers with men even more loyal to him and took more effective de facto control of the Wehrmacht, which de jure, he already commanded. Some senior officers of the Wehrmacht protested against the changes, most notably Colonel General Ludwig Beck, who circulated a petition signed by Colonel General Gerd von Rundstedt and others. 

After the defeat outside Moscow in December 1941, Hitler took personal command of the armed forces through the OKW and appointed himself as commander of the OKH after Walther von Brauchitsch was relieved and transferred to the leadership reserve (Führerreserve). Hitler then began participating at OKW, where Keitel never dared to oppose him.

Disproving of charges against Fritsch
It became known that the charges against Fritsch were false. The information in the file was, in fact, about a Rittmeister (cavalry captain), called Achim von Frisch. Himmler and Heydrich still pursued the case, conveniently discovering an individual, called Hans Schmidt, to serve as a witness in support of the charge. The Wehrmacht demanded a court of honour of officers to examine the Blomberg–Fritsch Affair, as it had come to be known. The proceedings were presided over by Hermann Göring. Schmidt claimed to recognise Fritsch as an officer whom he had witnessed in a homosexual act in a public lavatory with a man, known in translation as "Bavarian Joe". However, Schmidt was exposed as a notorious criminal whose Berlin gang had specialized in the blackmail of homosexuals.

Members of the German officer corps were appalled at the mistreatment of Fritsch, and at the next meeting, Himmler, Göring and even Hitler might have come under pressure from them, as the case against Fritsch was seen as weak. The successful annexation (Anschluss) of Austria shortly thereafter, however, silenced the critics. Colonel General Beck resigned on 18 August 1938 and Colonel General von Rundstedt obtained permission to retire in October 1938.

Schmidt withdrew his accusations against Fritsch and he was formally acquitted on 18 March, but the damage to his reputation had been done. Although the army demanded he be restored to his former position as Commander-in-Chief, Hitler would only make him honorary colonel of an artillery regiment. Just after the German invasion of Poland, Fritsch was inspecting front-line troops when he was shot by a Polish bullet (either a machine gun or a sharpshooter) in the leg and died.

See also
 Hossbach Memorandum

References

Sources
 Faber, David, Munich, 1938: Appeasement and World War II (2008) pp. 46–75.

External links
http://www.dhm.de/lemo/html/nazi/innenpolitik/fritschblom/
 http://avalon.law.yale.edu/imt/04-25-46.asp

1938 in Germany
LGBT in Nazi Germany
LGBT-related controversies in Germany
Political controversies in Germany
LGBT people and military service
Military scandals
Sex scandals
Gay history
Military of Nazi Germany